The Central Belt of Scotland is the area of highest population density within Scotland. Depending on the definition used, it has a population of between 2.4 and 4.2 million (the country's total was around 5.4 million in 2019), including Greater Glasgow, Ayrshire, Falkirk, Edinburgh, Lothian and Fife.

Despite the name, it is not geographically central  but is nevertheless at the "waist" of Scotland on a conventional map and the term "central" is used in many local government, police and NGO designations.

It was formerly known as the Midlands or Scottish Midlands but this term has fallen out of fashion.

The Central Belt lies between the Highlands to the north and the Southern Uplands to the south.

Smaller Central Belt

The area is often considered as the "triangle" defined by the M8, M80 and M9 motorways stretching from Greenock and Glasgow in the west to Edinburgh in the east, encompassing towns such as Paisley, Cambuslang, Hamilton, Stirling, Falkirk, Cumbernauld, Livingston and Bathgate. It has been referred to as the Lowland Triangle. The population of the local authority areas which are wholly within this territory and have no extensive unpopulated areas was approximately 2.39 million in 2018.

Larger Central Belt

The larger Central Belt is a trapezoid, not precisely defined, but essentially encompassing the generally low-lying areas from Helensburgh to Montrose (the Highland Boundary Fault) and from Girvan to Dunbar (the Southern Uplands Fault). This also takes in fairly densely populated regions such as Ayrshire and East Lothian, and encompasses all the major cities of Scotland, except for Aberdeen and Inverness which are located in the north of the country, as well as the bulk of Scotland's industrial works. Including rural parts of the council areas involved, the total population was around 4.28 million in 2018.

Similar terms
There are several terms in common usage in a Scottish context with a similar meaning to "Central Belt".

 The Central Lowlands is geologically defined and covers an area that stretches further to the north east than the Central Belt.
 The "Midland Valley" is a less commonly used expression synonymous with "Central Lowlands".
 The Scottish Lowlands are topographically and culturally defined and include all of Scotland outside of the Highlands and Islands, including the Southern Uplands.
 Central Scotland is a less well-defined term used to mean various things, including "Central Lowlands" and "Central Belt".

See also
 The Centre of Scotland
 Dublin–Belfast corridor – population 3.3 million

Notes

Citations

External links
Central Belt Way, VisitScotland

Geography of Scotland
Regions of Scotland
Belt regions
Scottish Lowlands